The DC Universe Roleplaying Game is a Legend System-based role-playing game  set in the DC Comics universe and published by West End Games.

History
The game system had several supplementary publications in print during the 1999–2002 timeframe, including:

 Sourcebooks, devoted to covering the key characters, organizations and technologies of the DC Universe setting. Published volumes were thematically organized (e.g. Superman-related characters in the Metropolis Sourcebook, Batman-related characters in the Gotham City Sourcebook, etc.).
 A series of Daily Planet Guides, sourcebooks designed to resemble travel guide to the fictional settings they detailed, written from the points-of-view of assorted characters known to either live in or regularly visit those backdrops. Published volumes in this line of sourcebooks covered Gotham City and Metropolis.

Reviews
Pyramid

References

External links
 RPG Geek entry
 SuperheroRPGs.com entry
 RPG.net entry

D6 System
DC Comics role-playing games
Role-playing games introduced in 1999
West End Games games